A famine is a widespread shortage of food that may apply to any faunal species.

Famine may also refer to:

 Famine (comics), fictional character in the Marvel Comics universe
 Famine (O'Flaherty novel), by Liam O'Flaherty
 Famine (Masterton novel), 1981 novel by Graham Masterton
 Famine (film), 2011 horror film
 Famine (album), 2007 album by Graves of Valor
 Famine, 1977 play by Tom Murphy
 "Famine", a song by Ten in the Swear Jar from Accordion Solo!, 2005
 The Famine, death metal band
 The Famine (film), 1915 film
 The Famines (band), Canadian rock band
 La sale Famine de Valfunde, member of the black metal band Peste Noire